Emily Noor (born 5 March 1971 in Someren) is a Dutch professional table tennis player.

Career highlights

Summer Olympic Games
1996, Atlanta, women's doubles, 1st round
World Championships
1987, New Delhi, women's doubles, last 32
1987, New Delhi, team competition, 4th
1989, Dortmund, mixed doubles, last 32
1991, Chiba, women's doubles, last 16
1991, Chiba, mixed doubles, last 32
World Team Cup:
1994, Nîmes, 3rd 
Pro Tour Meetings
1996, Kitaku-Shu, women's doubles, quarter final
1996, Fort Lauderdale, women's singles, quarter final
1997, Luon, women's doubles, quarter final
European Championships
1990, Gothenburg, women's singles, last 16
1996, Bratislava, women's doubles, runner-up

External links
 ITTF Profile

1971 births
Living people
Dutch female table tennis players
Olympic table tennis players of the Netherlands
People from Someren
Table tennis players at the 1996 Summer Olympics
Sportspeople from North Brabant